The golden Atlantic tree-rat (Phyllomys blainvillii) is a spiny rat species found in Brazil.

References

Phyllomys
Mammals described in 1837